Putti Bearing a Tondo showing the Drunkenness of Noah is a painting by Domenico Beccafumi, executed c. 1522–1523. 

It was recorded in the Medici inventories in the 17th century and derives from an incomplete composition now in the Monte dei Paschi's collections in Siena. The work is now in the Museo Horne in Florence.

Bibliography
Anna Maria Francini Ciaranfi, Beccafumi, Sadea Editore/Sansoni, Firenze 1967.
Elisabetta Nardinocchi (a cura di), Guida al Museo Horne, Edizioni Polistampa, Firenze 2011. 

1520s paintings
Paintings in the collection of the Museo Horne
Paintings by Domenico Beccafumi
Paintings depicting Noah
Paintings of children